David Willey  (born ) is a BBC reporter and journalist based in Rome. He has served as Vatican correspondent since 1971, under five Popes.

Biography 
Willey read law and modern languages at Queens' College, Cambridge, where he was a member of the Cherubs dining society and The Bats (the college drama society), and went from there to a Reuters trainee post in Rome. This was followed by a period in Algeria (1960–64), where he worked as a freelance reporter after that country's independence from France in 1962. In 1964, he became the BBC's correspondent in East Africa. His career continued in 1965 with a spell in Asia, where he reported widely on the early part of the Vietnam War from Saigon, then the capital of South Vietnam. Also in 1965 he reported from Beijing for the BBC, becoming one of its first foreign correspondents to report from China since the communist revolution. He was based in London from 1969 to 1971 in the post of the corporation's Assistant Diplomatic Correspondent, becoming the BBC's Rome correspondent in August 1972.

He is the author of The Promise of Francis: The Man, The Pope And The Challenge Of Change (Simon & Schuster, 2015)  which assesses the high expectations aroused by the election of the first pope from Latin America.  His other books include: Italians (BBC Books, 1984) and God's Politician (Faber & Faber, and St Martin's Press, 1992), a critical biography of Pope John Paul II, whom he accompanied on more than 40 of his foreign journeys as a member of the Vatican press.

He was appointed to the Order of the British Empire in 2003 for services to broadcast journalism.

References

External links
David Willey (journalist) "From our Rome correspondent"; Archive on Four; BBC Radio 4

BBC newsreaders and journalists
British reporters and correspondents
Living people
Year of birth missing (living people)
Alumni of Queens' College, Cambridge
Officers of the Order of the British Empire